"Round the World with the Rubber Duck" is the 1976 novelty song performed by C.W. McCall (pseudonym of Bill Fries) that was the sequel to the similar truck-driving country hit, "Convoy". This track was not as popular as its predecessor.

Content
The song continues the story about the fictitious truck convoy from the song "Convoy". The truckers cross to Europe ("there ain't no way out 'cept for that one Atlantic Ocean") and travel through several countries including Great Britain, Germany, Russia, and Japan.  At the end of the song, there is also a reference to Australia ("Ah, ten-four, Pig Pen, what's your twenty? Australia? Mercy sakes, ain't nothin' down there but Tasmanian devils and them cue-walla bears.").  The lyrics consist of different types of interspersed dialog including simulated CB conversations with CB slang and the chorus sung with a pirate accent and self-mocking background vocals ("Dumb, Dumb, Dumb, This is").  The song's CB dialog includes parodied British, German, Russian, and Japanese accents, with typically mispronounced words.

Chart performance

References and notes

1976 singles
C. W. McCall songs
Novelty songs
Sequel songs
1976 songs
Citizens band radio in popular culture
Songs about truck driving
Polydor Records singles